Choreutis marzoccai is a moth in the family Choreutidae. It was described by Pastrana in 1991. It is found in Argentina.

References

Natural History Museum Lepidoptera generic names catalog

Choreutis
Moths described in 1991